Aeribacillus is a genus in the phylum Bacillota (Bacteria).

Etymology
The name Aeribacillus derives from:Latin noun aer aeris, air; Latin masculine gender noun bacillus, a small rod; New Latin masculine gender noun Aeribacillus, aerobic small rod.

Species
The genus contains a single species, namely A. pallidus ( (Scholz et al. 1988) Miñana-Galbis et al. 2010,  (Type species of the genus).; Latin masculine gender adjective pallidus, pale, pallid, referring to the pale colony colour.)

See also
 Bacterial taxonomy
 Microbiology

References 

Bacteria genera
Bacillaceae
Monotypic bacteria genera